Nobby the Aardvark is a platform game for the Commodore 64, published in 1993 by Thalamus.

Gameplay

Nobby the Aardvark is a platform game taking place over multiple levels. The player takes the role of Nobby, an aardvark who eats ants. The game's plot involves Nobby trying to get to Antopia, a place where there are ants everywhere, so Nobby can eat.

In practice, the majority of the levels involve Nobby jumping from one platform to another to reach the exit. Various enemies inhabit the levels. Contact with an enemy is fatal to Nobby, but there are anthills scattered around the levels, and Nobby can spit the ants at enemies to defeat them. Later levels vary the gameplay by having Nobby fly in a hot air balloon or navigate a maze-like mine shaft.

Reception
Zzap!64 gave Nobby the Aardvark a 96% rating, putting it in the "Gold Medal" category.

See also
The Ant and the Aardvark, a cartoon series that inspired the game.

References

1993 video games
Commodore 64 games
Commodore 64-only games
Fictional aardvarks
Platform games
Single-player video games
Thalamus Ltd games
Video games about ants
Video games about insects
Video games developed in the United Kingdom